The Forty Foot is a promontory on the southern tip of Dublin Bay at Sandycove, County Dublin, Ireland, from which people have been swimming in the Irish Sea all year round for some 250 years.

Name
The name "Forty Foot" is somewhat obscure.

Others have attempted to link it to the 40th (the 2nd Somersetshire) Regiment of Foot, who supposedly bathed there, but they were stationed at Richmond Barracks in Inchicore.

Use
At first, it was exclusively a male bathing place, and Sandycove Bathers Association, a men's swimming club was established. Owing to its relative isolation and gender-restrictions it became a popular spot for nudists. On 24 July 1974, about a dozen  of female equal-rights activists ("Dublin City Women’s Invasion Force") went swimming, and sat with placards. and later, including less than five women, swam nude, in 1989, now swimming is open to men, women, and children. In 2014, the Sandycove Bathers Association ended the ban on women club members, and they may now use the onsite changing rooms and clubhouse kitchen. The swimming club requests voluntary contributions for the upkeep of the area.

Safety
Death, near-drowning and hypothermia have resulted from swimming at Forty Foot.

In literature
James Joyce and Oliver St. John Gogarty once resided at the Martello tower together. It is now the James Joyce Tower and Museum.  The opening section of Joyce's Ulysses is set here, with the characters Stephen Dedalus and Buck Mulligan being partly based on Joyce himself and Gogarty, respectively. Buck Mulligan described the sea as "The snotgreen sea. The scrotumtightening sea."

The Forty Foot also featured in the novels At Swim-Two-Birds by Flann O'Brien (1939), At Swim, Two Boys by Jamie O'Neill (2001) and  Nessuna notizia dello scrittore scomparso  by Daniele Bresciani (2017).

In media
The Forty Foot is featured in the series Bad Sisters.

Further reading

Images

References

External links
40foot.org usurped site
Fortyfoot.org usurped site
the Forty Foot, 1982 RTE documentary

Places in Dún Laoghaire–Rathdown